Fairfax Pond-Rehe Wildlife Management Area is located on  south of Reedsville in Preston County, West Virginia, United States. The wildlife management area is centered on a series of ponds and wetlands remaining from previous strip mining operations. The land was acquired in 2014.

Access to the Fairfax Pond – Rehe WMA can be gained from West Virginia Route 92 on Arthur Road (County Route 92/1) and Dogtown Road (County Route 56/2). Primary species for hunting include deer, wild turkey, waterfowl and grouse. Trapping for beaver, muskrat, raccoon and bobcat is available on the area. Fishing opportunities for largemouth bass, bluegill and other sunfish exist in two impoundments located on the WMA.

See also
Animal conservation
Fishing
Hunting
List of West Virginia wildlife management areas

References

External links
West Virginia DNR District 1 Wildlife Management Areas
West Virginia Hunting Regulations
West Virginia Fishing Regulations

Wildlife management areas of West Virginia
Protected areas of Preston County, West Virginia
Protected areas established in 2014
2014 establishments in West Virginia